Posyolok otdeleniya 2 sovkhoza Krasnaya Zvezda is a rural locality (a settlement) in Sysoyevskoye Rural Settlement, Surovikinsky District, Volgograd Oblast, Russia. The population was 14 as of 2010.

Geography 
The settlement is located 22 km southwest of Surovikino (the district's administrative centre is not real) by road.

References 

Rural localities in Surovikinsky District